Loweina is a small genus of lanternfishes.

Species
There are currently three recognized species in this genus:
 Loweina interrupta (Tåning, 1928)
 Loweina rara (Lütken, 1892) (Laura's lantern fish)
 Loweina terminata Becker, 1964

References

Myctophidae
Marine fish genera
Taxa named by Henry Weed Fowler